The forest emo skink  (Emoia tropidolepis) is a species of lizard in the family Scincidae. It is found in Papua New Guinea.

References

Emoia
Reptiles described in 1914
Reptiles of Papua New Guinea
Endemic fauna of Papua New Guinea
Taxa named by George Albert Boulenger
Skinks of New Guinea